Chemical coloring of metals is the process of changing the color of metal surfaces with different chemical solutions.

The chemical coloring of metals can be split into three types:

electroplating – coating the metal surface with another metal using electrolysis.
patination – chemically reacting the metal surface to form a colored oxide or salt.
anodizing – electrolytic passivation process used to increase the thickness of the natural oxide layer, producing a porous surface which can accept organic or inorganic dyes easily. In the case of titanium, niobium, and stainless steel, the colour formed is dependent on the thickness of the oxide (which is determined by the anodizing voltage).

Chemically coloring a metal is distinct from simply coating it using a method such as gilding or mercury silvering, because chemical coloring involves a chemical reaction, whereas simple coating does not.

History
The processes of chemical coloring of metals are as old as metalworking technology. Some of the earliest-known examples of colored metal objects are about 5,000 years old. They are bronze casts with some silver-colored parts, which originate from the Anatolian region. Similar processes can be found on some ancient Egyptian copper sheets. Another example of early chemical coloring of metals is the Nebra sky disk, which has a green patina and gold inlays. An early example of black colored iron is the famous Celtic spearhead found in the River Thames and dated between 200 and 50 BC.

Pliny the Elder mentioned the distinction between naturally occurring and artificial patina in the first century CE. Another ancient document about the chemical coloring of metals is the Leyden papyrus X (3rd century CE).

Two important sources from the Middle Ages on chemically colored metals are the Mappae clavicula, which was dated between the 9th and 12th centuries, and Theophilus Presbyter's work De Diversis Artibus, which was dated to the 12th century.

At the time of the Renaissance, the most significant documents were the Treatise on Goldsmithing and the Treatise on Sculpture by the famous Italian mannerist, sculptor and goldsmith Benvenuto Cellini. Patination is also briefly mentioned by Italian painter and writer Giorgio Vasari and by Pomponius Gauricus in his work De Sculptura 1504. André Felibien also briefly mentions some techniques for patination of bronze sculptures in his work Principes in 1699.

The beginning of modern science-based chemical or electrochemical coloring of metals is marked by Leopoldo Nobili's (1784–1835) discovery of Nobilis colored rings in 1826. Leonhard Elsner, Alexander Watt, Antoine César Becquerel (1788–1878) and Rudolf Christian Böttger (1806–1881) are also important people in the early history of electrochemical coloring of metals. George Richards Elkington (1801–1865), known for his patent for the electroplating of silver and gold (1840), had patented at least one electrochemical metal coloring process ( his procedure was further elaborated and perfected by the American J.E. Stareck  1937. ). In the 19th century, the first manuals dedicated exclusively to the chemical coloring of metals were published. In 1868, Puscher reported on the application of multicolored or lustre patina based on sodium thiosulphate and lead acetate for the first time.

Since the end of the 18th century, chemical coloring of metals has been a regular topic of various collections of chemical technology recipes, and from the mid-19th century onwards, this topic was included in most electroplating manuals and handbooks of goldsmiths and silversmiths.

Great progress was made in the industrial application of chemical coloring of metals in the early 20th century. For example, around 1905, the first patents for black nickel (German patents DRP 183972 and DRP 201663) and black oxide (circa 1915–1922, German patents DRP 292603, DRP 357198, DRP 368548) were made. Between 1923 and 1927, the first UK patents relating to oxidised aluminium were published., and black chromium was developed in 1929 (German patent GP 607, 420).

After the Second World War, there was a growing interest in green patinated copper sheets, which were intended primarily for architectural use. Technologies for anodic oxidation of titanium, and later niobium and tantalum, have evolved since the mid-1960s. Technology for the anodic oxidation of stainless steel was developed too in 1957. (patent US 2957812A).

Now, the possibilities of using bacterial cultures in the patination of copper and iron are being investigated, and laser-induced staining of copper and its alloys, niobium, stainless steel, and chromium plated objects, are being tested.

Uses
Chemical coloring of metals is primarily used in the manufacture of sculptures, jewelry, badges, medals, and decorations. It is also used in architecture, in the manufacture of metal furniture, and for military purposes as well as decorative vessels. It is used in the restoration and conservation of metals to some extent.

Examples
The metal to color should be completely free from oxide and grease. Protective clothing, gloves and goggles should be used in a well-ventilated area or outdoors.

Black for silver 

Items are immersed in a 2.5% solution of potassium or sodium sulfide, after the appearance of the color wash objects well and wax or varnish it.

Green for copper and its alloys

Paint or spray objects with a solution of 250 grams of ammonium carbonate / 250 grams of ammonium chloride / 1 litre of water, each layer is dried for 24 hours, after reaching the desired shade wax or lacquer it. As base color you can use brown or black patina for copper. If the amount of chlorides decreases the color will be more bluish-green if carbonate decreases more yellow-green.

Black for copper

Solution of sodium polysulfide 2.5%, items must be submerged in the solution after color developing, wash, dry and wax or varnish colored object.

Brown for copper

Items are boiled in at least 3-day-old water solution of 12% copper sulfate, after color being developed, the material is washed, dried and waxed or varnished.

Black for iron

Coat object with a very thin layer of linseed oil, then gradually heat it to 300–400 °C, repeat the procedure if necessary, this process can be used on any metal, which can be heated to the temperature mentioned (except lead, tin and its alloys).

Brown for iron

Use a 5% aqueous solution of ferric chloride. The object is coated with a solution, after 24 hours it is rubbed with coarse cloth or finest steel wool, the process is repeated at least three times, finally, the material should be wiped with a greasy rag.

Gray for tin or pewter

Use 20% aqueous solution of ferric chloride, it is necessary to immerse the objects in solution, dry and wax or varnish.

Gray-black for zinc

Use 20% aqueous solution of ferric chloride, the objects are immersed for 20 minutes, after the appearance of colour, objects should be washed, dried and waxed or varnished.

Black for aluminum

use boiling solution of 20 g ammonium molybdate and 5 g of sodium thiosulfate in a liter of water, immerse the objects, rinse, dry, wax or lacquer after the development of color.

Lustre colours

Use a solution of 280 g of sodium thiosulphate, 25 g of cupric acetate and 30 g of citric acid. It can be used on copper and its alloys, silver, nickel, iron, gold. The color depends on the duration of immersion, the sequence of colors on brass: Golden yellow-copper-purple-dark, blue-light, blue-chrome-nickel-red-grey, blue, and gray-black to iron or carbon steel. Variant for tin and pewter: 250 g sodium thiosulphate, 60 g copper acetate, 25 mL acetone, 1 L water, 45-85 °C, 1–20 minutes, gold -pink -blue - green. Variant for stainless steel: 100 g sodium thiosulphate, 10 g lead acetate, 12 g potassium sodium tartrate, 12 g copper sulfate, 1 lit water, 18-22 °C temperature of solution, 5–50 minutes, yellow, brown, red, green, blue, violet ,object must be in contact with piece of copper 300 times smaller surface than surface of treated object.

Different colors on titanium

As a simple electrolyte, it is possible to use a 3% solution of trisodium phosphate, a cathode of stainless steel, object as anode. The color depends on voltage. Many other electrolytes can be used—even Coca-Cola. Straw yellow / 10V – violet / 29 V – blue / 30 V – blue green 45 V – light green / 55 V – purple-red / 75 V – grey / 110 V. It is mandatory that this process must be performed wearing rubber gloves (potentially dangerous voltage!).

Various colors on stainless steel 18 Cr / 8 Ni

7.5 g of sodium dichromate, 1000 mL of sulfuric acid (1.24 g/cm3), lead cathodes, object as an anode, 70-90 °C temp, 0,06 A/dm2, voltage 1.3 V – colors depend on the duration of the procedure (5-50 min.), brown, blue, reddish brown, yellow, green. According to Russian literature after processing items should be soaked in a solution of potassium bichromate (5-10%), 5–15 minutes, 70-90 °C temperature of the solution.
According to one Chinese patent, treated objects can be then immersed in a hot diluted sodium silicate solution (1-5%,95-100 C,3-10 min.). Hexavalent chromates are carcinogenic and toxic, molybdate-based solutions are now being proposed as a substitute (for example molybdate 30-100g/H2SO4 10-18 g/manganese sulfate 0.5 g /1 litre water. 0.1 -20 A/dm2, 0.1–15 minutes).

References

Literature

External links
Lewton Brain, C. Patinas for small studios (1985)
Budija, G. Collection of formulas for the chemical,electrochemical and heat colouring of metals,the cyanide free immersion plating and electroplating, Zagreb 2011.

Metalworking
Artworks in metal